The following is an incomplete list of current and defunct magazines published in Switzerland. They are published in German, French, Italian or other languages.

A

 Aero Revue
 Annabelle
 Animan
 Art International

B

 Beobachter
 Das Beste
 Bilan
 BILANZ
 Bolero
 Bulletin des Schweizer
 Business Mir

C

 Cabaret Voltaire
 Camera
 Cash
 Cenobio
 Correspondance bi-mensuelle

D
 La Distinction
 Dusie
 Du

E
 Emois
 Ex Tempore

F
 FACTS
 Fakes Forgeries Experts
 FRAZ: Frauenzeitung

G
 Gauchebdo
 The Global Journal

H
 L'Hebdo

I

 Il Diavolo
 illustrazione
 L'Illustré
 L'impact
 Interavia

J
 Jugend-Internationale

K
 Der Kreis

L

 La Revue militaire suisse
 Lords of Rock

M
 Das Magazin
 Micro Journal

N
 Nebelspalter
 Newly Swissed
 NZZ Geschichte

O
 Old man

P
 Parkett
 Politik und Wirtschaft
 Posledniya Izvestia
 PME Magazine

R
 Le Révolté
 Revue Automobile
 Rote Revue

S

 La Salamandre
 Schweizer Eisenbahn-Revue
 Schweizer Familie
 Schweizer Illustrierte
 Schweizer Monat
 Schweizerzeit
 SI Style
 Sept.info
 Signal
 Spendere Meglio
 Stocks 
 Sur La Terre International
 Swiss Book
 Swiss Derivatives Review
 Swiss IT Magazine

T
 Technologist
 Terre & Nature
 Travelling 
 Tribune des Arts
 La Tuile

U
 UN Special

V
 Vigousse

W
 Welt der Tiere
 Die Weltwoche

Z
 Zoom

See also
 List of newspapers in Switzerland

References

Switzerland
Magazines